Bijan Zolfagharnasab (born June 7, 1949 in Sanandaj) is a retired Iranian football player and currently a football manager.

He started his professional career with Pas Tehran, before changing to Persepolis F.C. in 1974. There he could win the Iranian championship in 1976 and reach runner-up position in 1975, in 1977 and in 1978. After the Iranian Revolution he remained playing for Persepolis winning the Iranian nationwide tournament Espandi Cup in 1979 before retiring from football and starting his studies in Physical Education in Brussels.

He was a starter at the 1976 Asian Cup in Tehran, which Iran won. He also participated in the football tournament at the 1976 Olympics, where Iran progressed to the quarter-finals. As of June 2011, he is a member of Technical Committee of Persepolis.

He received his Ph.D. from the University of Brussels in the field of Physical Education in the early 80's.

Coaching career statistics

References

  Alt URL

Iranian footballers
Living people
1949 births
People from Sanandaj
Persepolis F.C. players
Université libre de Bruxelles alumni
Esteghlal F.C. managers
Sanat Mes Kerman F.C. managers
Zob Ahan Esfahan F.C. managers
Damash Gilan managers
Olympic footballers of Iran
1976 AFC Asian Cup players
Footballers at the 1976 Summer Olympics
AFC Asian Cup-winning players
Pas players
Association football defenders
Kurdish sportspeople
Paykan F.C. managers
Iranian football managers
Sanat Naft Abadan F.C. managers
Iran international footballers
Persian Gulf Pro League managers
Bargh Shiraz F.C. managers